Amblyptilia viettei is a moth of the family Pterophoridae that is known from Madagascar.

References

Amblyptilia
Moths described in 1994
Endemic fauna of Madagascar
Moths of Africa